The rod, perch, or pole (sometimes also lug) is a surveyor's tool and unit of length of various historical definitions, often between approximately 3 and 8 meters (9 ft 10 in and 26 ft 2 in). In modern US customary units it is defined as  US survey feet, equal to exactly  of a mile, or a quarter of a surveyor's chain ( yards), and is exactly 5.0292 meters. The rod is useful as a unit of length because integer multiples of it can form one acre of square measure (area). The 'perfect acre' is a rectangular area of 43,560 square feet, bounded by sides 660 feet (a furlong) long and 66 feet wide (220 yards by 22 yards) or, equivalently, 40 rods and 4 rods. An acre is therefore 160 square rods or 10 square chains.

The name perch derives from the Ancient Roman unit, the pertica.
The measure also has a relationship with the military pike of about the same size. Both measures date from the sixteenth century, when the pike was still utilized in national armies. The tool has largely been supplanted by electronic tools such as surveyor lasers (lidar) and optical target devices for surveying lands. Surveyors rods and chains are still used in rough terrains with heavy overgrowth where laser or other optical measurements are difficult or impossible. In dialectal English the term lug has also been used, although the Oxford English Dictionary states that this unit, while usually of  feet, may also be of 15, 18, 20, or 21 feet.

In the United States until 1 January 2023, the rod was often defined as 16.5 US survey feet, or approximately 5.029 210 058 m.

History

In England, the perch was officially discouraged in favour of the rod as early as the 15th century; however, local customs maintained its use.

Until English King Henry VIII seized the lands of the Roman Catholic Church in 1536, land measures as we now know them were essentially unknown. Instead a narrative system of landmarks and lists was used. Henry wanted to raise even more funds for his wars than he'd seized directly from church property (he'd also assumed the debts of the monasteries), and as James Burke writes and quotes in the book Connections that the English monk Richard Benese "produced a book on how to survey land using the simple tools of the time, a rod with cord carrying knots at certain intervals, waxed and resined against wet weather." Benese poetically described the measure of an acre in terms of a perch:

The practice of using surveyor's chains, and perch-length rods made into a detachable stiff chain, came about a century later when iron was a more plentiful and common material. There are 10 chains or 40 rods in a furlong (eighth-mile), and so 80 chains or 320 rods in one statute mile (1760 yards, 1609.344 m, 1.609344 km); the definition of which was legally set in 1593 and popularized by Royal surveyor (called the 'sworn viewer') John Ogilby only after the Great Fire of London (1666).

An acre is defined as the area of 10 square chains (that is, an area of one chain by one furlong), and derives from the shapes of new-tech plows and the desire to quickly survey seized church lands into a quantity of squares for quick sales by Henry VIII's agents; buyers simply wanted to know what they were buying whereas Henry was raising cash for wars against Scotland and France. Consequently, the surveyor's chain and surveyor rods or poles (the perch) have been used for several centuries in Britain and in many other countries influenced by British practices such as North America and Australia. By the time of the industrial revolution and the quickening of land sales, canal and railway surveys, et al. Surveyor rods such as used by George Washington were generally made of dimensionally stable metal—semi-flexible drawn wrought iron linkable bar stock (not steel), such that the four folded elements of a chain were easily transportable through brush and branches when carried by a single man of a surveyor's crew. With a direct ratio to the length of a surveyor's chain and the sides of both an acre and a square (mile), they were common tools used by surveyors, if only to lay out a known plottable baseline in rough terrain thereafter serving as the reference line for instrumental (theodolite) triangulations.

In ancient cultures
The perch as a lineal measure in Rome (also decempeda) was 10 Roman feet (2.96 metres), and in France varied from 10 feet (perche romanie) to 22 feet (perche d'arpent—apparently  of "the range of an arrow"—about 220 feet). To confuse matters further, by ancient Roman definition, an arpent equalled 120 Roman feet.

In continental Europe

They were subdivided in many different ways, and were of many different lengths.

Based on data from the following:
N - Niemann (Quedlinburg and Leipzig - 1830).

In Britain
In England, the rod or perch was first defined in law by the Composition of Yards and Perches, one of the statutes of uncertain date from the late 13th to early 14th centuries: tres pedes faciunt ulnam, quinque ulne & dimidia faciunt perticam (three feet make a yard, five and a half yards make a perch).

The length of the chain was standardized in 1620 by Edmund Gunter at exactly four rods. Fields were measured in acres, which were one chain (four rods) by one furlong (in the United Kingdom, ten chains).

Bars of metal one rod long were used as standards of length when surveying land. The rod was still in use as a common unit of measurement in the mid-19th century, when Henry David Thoreau used it frequently when describing distances in his work, Walden.

In traditional Scottish units, a Scottish rood (ruid in Lowland Scots, ròd in Scottish Gaelic), also fall measures 222 inches (6 ells).

Modern use
The rod was phased out as a legal unit of measurement in the United Kingdom as part of a ten-year metrication process that began on 24 May 1965.

In the US, the rod, along with the chain, furlong, and statute mile (as well as the survey inch and survey foot) were based on the pre-1959 values for United States customary units of linear measurement until 1 January 2023. The Mendenhall Order of 1893 defined the yard as exactly  meters, with all other units of linear measurement, including the rod, based on the yard. In 1959, an international agreement (the International yard and pound agreement), defined the yard as the fundamental unit of length in the Imperial/USCU system, defined as exactly 0.9144 metres. However, the above-noted units, when used in surveying, may retain their pre-1959 values, depending on the legislation in each state.The U.S. National Geodetic Survey and National Institute of Standards and Technology have replaced the definition for the above-mentioned units by the International 1959 definition of the foot, being exactly 0.3048 meters.

Despite no longer being in widespread use, the rod is still employed in certain specialized fields. In recreational canoeing, maps measure portages (overland paths where canoes must be carried) in rods; typical canoes are approximately one rod long. The term is also in widespread use in the acquisition of pipeline easements, as the offers for an easement are often expressed on a "price per rod".

In the United Kingdom, the sizes of allotment gardens continue to be measured in square poles in some areas, sometimes being referred to simply as poles rather than square poles.

In Vermont, the default right-of-way width of state and town highways and trails is three rods (49.5 feet or 15.0876 m). Rods can also be found on the older legal descriptions of tracts of land in the United States, following the "metes and bounds" method of land survey; as shown in this actual legal description of rural real estate:

Area and volume
The terms pole, perch, rod and rood have been used as units of area, and perch is also used as a unit of volume. As a unit of area, a square perch (the perch being standardized to equal  feet, or  yards) is equal to a square rod,  or  acre. There are 40 square perches to a rood (for example a rectangular area of 40 rods times one rod), and 160 square perches to an acre (for example a rectangular area of 40 rods times 4 rods). This unit is usually referred to as a perch or pole even though square perch and square pole were the more precise terms. Rod was also sometimes used as a unit of area to refer to a rood.

However, in the traditional French-based system in some countries, 1 square perche is 42.21 square metres.

As of August 2013, perches and roods are used as government survey units in Jamaica. They appear on most property title documents. The perch is also in extensive use in Sri Lanka, being favored even over the rood and acre in real estate listings there. Perches were informally used as a measure in Queensland real estate until the early 21st century, mostly for historical gazetted properties in older suburbs.

Volume
A traditional unit of volume for stone and other masonry. This is equivalent to exactly .

There are two different measurements for a perch depending on the type of masonry that is being built:

This is equivalent to exactly .
This is equivalent to exactly .

See also
 Anthropic units
 English units

References

Imperial units
Units of length
Customary units of measurement in the United States
Obsolete units of measurement
Units of measurement
Area